<noinclude>This is an outline of topics related to linear algebra, the branch of mathematics concerning linear equations and linear maps and their representations in vector spaces and through matrices.

Linear equations
Linear equation
System of linear equations
Determinant
Minor
Cauchy–Binet formula
Cramer's rule
Gaussian elimination
Gauss–Jordan elimination
Overcompleteness
Strassen algorithm

Matrices
Matrix
Matrix addition
Matrix multiplication
Basis transformation matrix
Characteristic polynomial
Trace
Eigenvalue, eigenvector and eigenspace
Cayley–Hamilton theorem
Spread of a matrix
Jordan normal form
Weyr canonical form
Rank
Matrix inversion, invertible matrix
Pseudoinverse
Adjugate
Transpose
Dot product
Symmetric matrix
Orthogonal matrix
Skew-symmetric matrix
Conjugate transpose
Unitary matrix
Hermitian matrix, Antihermitian matrix
Positive-definite, positive-semidefinite matrix
Pfaffian
Projection
Spectral theorem
Perron–Frobenius theorem
List of matrices
Diagonal matrix, main diagonal
Diagonalizable matrix
Triangular matrix
Tridiagonal matrix
Block matrix
Sparse matrix
Hessenberg matrix
Hessian matrix
Vandermonde matrix
Stochastic matrix
Toeplitz matrix
Circulant matrix
Hankel matrix
(0,1)-matrix

Matrix decompositions
Matrix decomposition
Cholesky decomposition
LU decomposition
QR decomposition
Polar decomposition
Reducing subspace
Spectral theorem
Singular value decomposition
Higher-order singular value decomposition
Schur decomposition
Schur complement
Haynsworth inertia additivity formula

Relations
Matrix equivalence
Matrix congruence
Matrix similarity
Matrix consimilarity
Row equivalence

Computations
Elementary row operations
Householder transformation
Least squares, linear least squares
Gram–Schmidt process
Woodbury matrix identity

Vector spaces
Vector space
Linear combination
Linear span
Linear independence
Scalar multiplication
Basis
Change of basis
Hamel basis
Cyclic decomposition theorem
Dimension theorem for vector spaces
Hamel dimension
Examples of vector spaces
Linear map
Shear mapping or Galilean transformation
Squeeze mapping or Lorentz transformation
Linear subspace
Row and column spaces
Column space
Row space
Cyclic subspace
Null space, nullity
Rank–nullity theorem
Nullity theorem
Dual space
Linear function
Linear functional
Category of vector spaces

Structures
Topological vector space
Normed vector space
Inner product space
Euclidean space
Orthogonality
Orthogonal complement
Orthogonal projection
Orthogonal group
Pseudo-Euclidean space
Null vector
Indefinite orthogonal group
 Orientation (geometry)
Improper rotation
 Symplectic structure

Multilinear algebra
Multilinear algebra
Tensor
Classical treatment of tensors
Component-free treatment of tensors
Gamas's Theorem
Outer product
Tensor algebra
Exterior algebra
Symmetric algebra
Clifford algebra
Geometric algebra

Topics related to affine spaces
Affine space
Affine transformation
Affine group
Affine geometry
Affine coordinate system
Flat (geometry)
Cartesian coordinate system
Euclidean group
Poincaré group
Galilean group

Projective space
Projective space
Projective transformation
Projective geometry
Projective linear group
Quadric and conic section

See also
Glossary of linear algebra
Glossary of tensor theory

Linear algebra
Linear algebra